The 2000 NCAA Men's Water Polo Championship was the 32nd annual NCAA Men's Water Polo Championship to determine the national champion of NCAA men's collegiate water polo. Tournament matches were played at Raleigh Runnels Memorial Pool in Malibu, California during December 2000.

UCLA defeated UC San Diego in the final, 11–2, to win their seventh, and second consecutive, national title. The Bruins (19–7) were coached by Guy Baker and Adam Krikorian.

The Most Outstanding Player of the tournament was Sean Kern from UCLA. Kern, along with seven other players, comprised the All-Tournament Team. 

Ivan Babic, from USC, was the tournament's leading scorer, with 9 goals.

Qualification
Since there has only ever been one single national championship for water polo, all NCAA men's water polo programs (whether from Division I, Division II, or Division III) were eligible. A total of 4 teams were invited to contest this championship.

Bracket
Site: Raleigh Runnels Memorial Pool, Malibu, California

All-tournament team 
Ivan Babic, USC
Jason Boettner, UC San Diego
Brandon Brooks, UCLA
Brian Brown, UCLA
Padraig Damjanov, USC
Sean Kern, UCLA (Most outstanding player)
Stever O'Rourke, USC
Brian Stahl, Navy
JC Miro, UCLA

See also 
 NCAA Men's Water Polo Championship
 NCAA Women's Water Polo Championship (began May 2001)

References

NCAA Men's Water Polo Championship
NCAA Men's Water Polo Championship
2000 in sports in California
December 2000 sports events in the United States
2000